The New Apostolic Church is a Christian denomination with a significant presence in Nigeria. It has hundreds of thousands of members in Nigeria. It is active in the United States and Europe, too. Nigeria is within the area of District Apostle Michael Ehrich of Southern Germany.

See also
Christianity in Nigeria

References

Christian denominations in Nigeria
Christian denominations in Africa
New Apostolic Church